Triainomyces is a genus of fungi in the family Laboulbeniaceae. A monotypic genus, it contains the single species Triainomyces hollowayanus.

References

External links
Triainomyces at Index Fungorum

Laboulbeniomycetes
Monotypic Laboulbeniomycetes genera